Adorándote: Un Tiempo a Solas Con El is an album from Puerto Rican Christian singer Julissa It was released on May 19, 2009.

Track listing

 "Escucharte Hablar" – 05:03
 "Tu Mirada" – 04:38
 "Gloria" – 04:23
 "El Que Lavó Mis Pies" – 04:31
 "La Niña De Tus Ojos" – 04:25
 "Por Quien Eres Tu (Because Of Who You Are)" – 04:47
 "Portador De Tu Gloria" – 04:20
 "Tu Eres Mi Amado" – 04:43
 "El Señor Es Mi Pastor" – 04:31
 "Te Alabaré Mi Buen Jesús, Cambiaré Mi Tristeza, Eres Fiel" – 07:41

Awards

The album was nominated for a Dove Award for Spanish Language Album of the Year at the 41st GMA Dove Awards.

Notes

External links
 Adorándote on Amazon.com

2009 albums
Julissa (singer) albums